The 2014 Mid-American Conference women's basketball tournament is the post-season basketball tournament for the Mid-American Conference (MAC) 2013–14 college basketball season. The 2014 tournament was held March 10–15, 2014. Third seeded Akron won the championship over fifth seeded Ball State. Rachel Tecca of Akron was the MVP.

Format
First round games will be held on campus sites at the higher seed on March 10. The remaining rounds will be held at Quicken Loans Arena, between March 12–15. As with the recent tournaments, the top two seeds receive byes into the semifinals, with the three and four seeds receiving a bye to the quarterfinals.

Schedule

Bracket

All-Tournament Team
Tournament MVP – Rachel Tecca, Akron

References

Mid-American Conference women's basketball tournament
2013–14 Mid-American Conference women's basketball season
MAC women's basketball tournament
MAC women's basketball tournament
Basketball competitions in Cleveland
College basketball tournaments in Ohio
Women's sports in Ohio
2010s in Cleveland